The 1981 Pacific Tigers football team represented the University of the Pacific (UOP) in the 1981 NCAA Division I-A football season as a member of the Pacific Coast Athletic Association.

The team was led by head coach Bob Toledo, in his third year, and played their home games at Pacific Memorial Stadium in Stockton, California. They finished the season with a record of five wins and six losses (5–6, 2–3 PCAA). The Tigers were outscored by their opponents 170–253 over the season.

Schedule

Team players in the NFL
The following UOP players were selected in the 1982 NFL Draft.

Notes

References

Pacific
Pacific Tigers football seasons
Pacific Tigers football